Belknap Springs is an unincorporated community and private hot springs resort in Lane County, Oregon, United States, near the McKenzie River. The springs were located and initially developed by R. S. Belknap in 1869. A post office named "Salt Springs" was established in the location in 1874, and the name changed to "Belknap Springs" in 1875. The post office closed in 1877 and reopened in 1891, operating intermittently until 1953. Today the location uses a McKenzie Bridge mailing address.

Belknap Hot Spring
The water is piped to the resort.

Touted as a mineral spa in the late 19th century, since then the resort site has gone through several changes of ownership and had various improvements made to it, including the addition of a hotel (currently a lodge) and cabins, forming a summer resort community. The resort has been almost continuously open to the public since the 1870s, except for a period of closure from 1968 to 1978.

Climate
This region experiences warm (but not hot) and dry summers, with no average monthly temperatures above .  According to the Köppen Climate Classification system, Belknap Springs has a warm-summer Mediterranean climate, abbreviated "Csb" on climate maps.

See also
Belknap Bridge
Belknap Crater
Spa town

References

External links

 from Belknap Hot Springs, Spa and Gardens, current owners of the hot springs resort
 from McKenzie Hot Springs Cottage (owned by descendants of original Belknap Springs owners)

Hot springs of Oregon
Spa towns in Oregon
Unincorporated communities in Lane County, Oregon
1874 establishments in Oregon
Populated places established in 1874
Unincorporated communities in Oregon